The Oddusuddan offensive  was a military operation in which the Tamil Tigers captured Oddusuddan from the Sri Lankan Army. They were also believed to have captured large amounts of weapons and ammunition as well as armoured vehicles during the operation. The offensive was part of Operation Unceasing Waves III.

See also
 List of Sri Lankan Civil War battles
 Operation Jayasikurui
 Battle of Mullaitivu
 Thandikulam-Omanthai offensive

References

Battles of Eelam War III
Conflicts in 1999
1999 in Sri Lanka
October 1999 events in Asia
November 1999 events in Asia